The Ernakulam–Kottayam–Kayamkulam line is a railway line which runs through the districts of Ernakulam, Kottayam, Pathanamthitta and Alappuzha in Kerala state of India. This railway line starts as a branch line from Ernakulam Town railway station towards Kottayam and joins with the Ernakulam–Kayamkulam coastal line route via Alappuzha at Kayamkulam Junction. This line comes under the Thiruvananthapuram railway division of Southern Railway Zone of Indian Railways. The Ernakulam Town/Ernakulam Junction - Kottayam section opened in 1956-57 and Kottayam - Kollam section in 1957.

Stations 
There are 18 railway stations along the stretch. The details of the railway stations (excluding Ernakulam D Cabin - ERSD) with annual earnings in 2018-2019 is shown below.

**Note:-

 Stations written in bold letters - Stations generating Rs. 2,00,00,000(Rs. 2 Crore) or more in a financial year.
 The criteria for categorization of stations have now been revised to include footfalls at the station. The stations have been clubbed into three groups -- Non-suburban (NS), Suburban (S) and Halt (H). These groups have further been put in grades ranging from NSG 1-6, SG 1-3 and HG 1-3, respectively

Significance 
This line has significant role in connecting people to various social, economic, political and religious centers of middle part of Kerala. The Chengannur station has been declared as the "Gateway of Sabarimala" by Indian Railways in 2009. During Sabarimala pilgrim (Mandala) season, state transport buses (KSRTC) operate from these stations (mainly from Chengannur and then Kottayam). Some of the major pilgrim centers and the nearest railway stations are shown below.

Tourism/Others

Kottayam is the nearest railway station which caters to famous tourist destinations like Kumarakom. The Changanacherry Railway Station acts as a gateway to Kuttanad and to tourist spots of Idukki. Hill Palace, Infopark-Kochi, various industries like KEL, FACT etc. are situated in proximity to Tripunithura railway station.

History 
Train service began in Travancore, erstwhile Kerala state on 26 November 1904, with the completion of the Kollam–Sengottai branch line, which was a part of Kollam - Chennai meter gauge route. On 4 November 1931, the Thiruvananthapuram Central Railway Station was launched. In 1956 during the formation of Kerala, the total length of railway line in the State was 745 km. Ernakulam and Kollam were not connected by rail then. The Ernakulam - Kottayam and Kottayam - Kollam railway lines were completed in 1956 and 1958 respectively. In December 1971, a Rs.13.59 crore project was established to convert the Thiruvananthapuram - Ernakulam line (220 km) from meter gauge to broad gauge was sanctioned. The work was completed in 1976.

These railway tunnels were built by ‘Metro man’ E Sreedharan during the early years of his career in 1955-56 at Kottayam. The two tunnels are part of the 1952 Ernakulam Town-Kollam railway line which was inaugurated by the then Prime Minister Jawaharlal Nehru.

Track doubling and other developments 
The Ernakulam–Kottayam–Kayamkulam line is fully electrified. The doubling works through this line received the green light sanction back in 2001. After multiple delays, doubling works were systematically completed and commissioned in all and the last stretches from the Ettumanoor to Chingavanam section, which was completed in May 2022. The Railway Chief Zone Safety Commissioner Abhay Kumar Rai conducted the safety inspection of this stretch on 23 May 2022 and this was ultimately commissioned on 29 May 2022. Thus, with the completion of doubling of the entire Ernakulam-Kottayam-Kayankulam line, it is expected that there would be a significant reduction in the late running of trains on this stretch, as well as the introduction of new trains.

Renovation works of railway stations on this stretch as part of the doubling works have mostly been completed, with introduction of new facilities to passengers. Recently Piravam Road, Vaikom Road, Kuruppanthara, Ettumanur, Chingavanam, Changanacherry, Tiruvalla, Chengannur were renovated as part of track doubling with either construction of new station buildings or renovation of platforms or new foot overbridges etc. Construction activities for relocating Ettumanur station to the middle of Neendoor and Athirampuzha roads are almost done. Due to this relocation, the station will be easily accessible for the commuters coming from MG University, Medical College Kottayam and Mannanam. The Kottayam station, which is the main station along the route has also been renovated during progress of rail doubling works.

The iconic tunnels between Chingavanam and Kottayam (near Kottayam station) have been used as shunting lines after track doubling. Although the initial plan was to build another tunnel, this idea was dropped after the topography was found to be unsuitable. Subsequently, a new double track has been made after removing earth for one kilometre on the side of the existing tunnels and railway overbridges have been deployed above the tracks. The existing tunnels will, in future, be used only for shunting as passenger traffic will be redirected to the new tracks.

Future Plans 
Various plans are in consideration to connect the line to various regions of middle Kerala.

 Ettumanoor – Pala Sabari Link line : A 15 km Ettumanoor – Pala new BG line is estimated by Kerala Rail Development Corporation (KRDCL) which connects Ettumanoor to proposed Pala station as part of the proposed Angamaly-Erumeli Sabari railway line. This line is expected to be a cost-effective link that will function as an outer ring rail for Kochi.
 Suburban Line: A suburban transit system is proposed between Thiruvananthapuram and Chengannur to cater to huge commuter transportation needs and introducing more trains like DEMU / MEMU. This project is under consideration of Kerala Rail Development Corporation (KRDCL) and a DPR is prepared by Mumbai Rail Vikas Corporation with an estimated cost Rs. 1,836 Crores.
 New lines from Tiruvalla/Chengannur: 1) A line from Tiruvalla to Thakazhi, a village in Alappuzha district (thus connecting the Ernakulam–Kottayam–Kayamkulam line and Ernakulam–Kayamkulam coastal line parallel rail lines) has been proposed.   2) A line connecting Chengannur to Pamba (nearest point of Sabarimala) via Ranni is waiting for approval. 3) A link to Erumeli-Punalur line, a proposed extension of Sabari line via Adoor, Pandalam.
Earlier there was a proposal for a broad gauge line between Kottayam and Madurai via Idukki and Theni. This line was proposed to implement rail connectivity to places in Idukki, Cumbam, Theni etc. and to promote transportation of agricultural, raw materials and other freight traffic between Tamil Nadu and Kerala. Now this project is not in active consideration.

However the Government of Kerala is now focusing on the alignment for the semi high speed rail corridor from Kochuveli to Kasaragod, which expects minimal land acquisition, faster means of travel from Thiruvananthapuram to Kasaragod. under KRDCL.

See also 
 Ernakulam–Kayamkulam coastal line
 Kollam–Sengottai branch line
 Shoranur–Cochin Harbour section
 Thiruvananthapuram railway division

References

External links 
1.Ernakulam - Kayamkulam Passenger(via Kottayam) https://indiarailinfo.com/train/timetable/ernakulam-kayamkulam-passenger-via-kottayam-56387/2729/52/57

2. Doubling work on speed track in 115 km long Ernakulam-Kottayam-Kayamkulam  http://www.deccanchronicle.com/amp/nation/current-affairs/270717/doubling-work-on-speed-track-in-115-km-long-ernakulam-kottayam-kayamkulam-section.html

3. Kerala Rail Development Corporation (KRDCL) Projects  http://krdcl.co.in/?page_id=12

Rail transport in Kerala
†
5 ft 6 in gauge railways in India
Transport in Kochi
Transport in Kottayam district